Tamagotchi (たまごっち) is a single by the Japanese band Kigurumi. It was released on November 21, 2007 by Victor Entertainment. Currently, "Tamagotchi" is the only single in which Kigurumi performs songs as a trio, and was the last single that Rena participated in with Kigurumi.

Background
After performing "Hottottotto na Mainichi" in Kigurumichiko, Kigurumi, who had only one member at the time (Rena), was given the opportunity to sing the opening theme to Tamagotchi: The Movie. However, the song required a trio. Auditions for the band were held, and on November 7, two new members, eleven-year-old Miki and seven-year-old Kei, were added to the band. The song was released with two different albums, and was slightly edited and used for the intro of "Tamagotchi: The Movie". Another version, "Tamagotchi: Happy Version", was released for use in the second Tamagotchi movie, using only Miki and Kei as singers.

Music video

A music video was released for the Japanese version only. In it, Rena, Miki, and Kei dance and sing to the song in a white room in which constantly morphing white shapes bounce around them. Occasionally, they will sit on white inflatable balls, appear on TVs, or watch a scene from the movie. Their outfits consist of short-sleeve, button up, knee-length dresses with white, puffed-out collars and sleeves, white boots with fringes matching the color of their dresses, and headwear that resembles characters from the movie; Rena stands in the middle and wears a yellow dress and a hat shaped like Mametchi's head, Miki stands to her left while wearing a green dress and a hat shaped like Kuchipatchi's head, and Kei stands to Rena's right while wearing an orange dress and a hat shaped like Memetchi's body.
Additionally, a flash video of Mametchi dancing to "Rena's Version" of the song was released on the official site and on the press-release version of the CD.

In Other Languages

English
An English version of the song was written by Stephanie Sheh for the English-language release of "Tamagotchi: The Movie". The song differs slightly from the Japanese version; one noticeable difference is at the beginning of the second verse. In the Japanese version, two full lines are sung by the first singer (Rena) and the next two by the second (Miki). In the English version, the first singer sings the first line and part of the second, but the last part of the second line is sung by the second singer. Another difference is that the second and fourth lines of the Japanese version of the song end in "ī deshō", which roughly translates as "it's great". The first part of the first verse and its translation is as follows in Japanese:
Minna issho
Issho wa ī deshō
Onaji jinsei
Ikiteru ī deshō
Which can translate into:
We're all together
Being together is great
We live together
On the same Earth, and it's great
However, the English version goes as follows:
Everyone come
Come and join us, take my hand
Where we can share life
Share it with you, hand in hand
This version was not released on any CD.

French
A French version of the song was written for the French release of Tamagotchi: Happiest Story in the Universe!. This version has lyrics that bear more resemblance to the original Japanese version, and is based on "Tamagotchi: Happy Version", but also has some noticeable differences. One difference is that at the end of the fourth line in each verse, the Japanese singers (who were Miki and Kei for the second movie's version) stay on the same note for the last word of the line. However, in the French version, the singers begin on the same note, but then drop down two notes in an arpeggio. Another difference is that the last line of each verse is held out a shorter time than in the English or Japanese versions. The first French verse, which translates almost exactly as the Japanese  one does, goes as follows:
On et tous ensem
Ensemble, c'est génial
La vie tous ensem
Ensemble, c'est génial
Again, this wasn't released on CD.

Track listing
たまごっち (Tamagotchi, Tamagotchi)
ちいさな星のように (Chiisana Hoshi Noyōni, Like a Little Star)
わたしはキグルミです (Watashi wa Kigurumi Desu, I am Kigurumi)
たまごっち(カラオケ) (Tamagotchi (Karaoke), Tamagotchi (Karaoke))
ちいさな星のように(カラオケ) (Chiisana Hoshi Noyōni (Karaoke), Like a Little Star (Karaoke))
わたしはキグルミです(カラオケ) (Watashi wa Kigurumi Desu (Karaoke), I am Kigurumi (Karaoke))

External links
 The CD on Amazon.com Japan
 Promotional Site (Japanese)
 Official Music Video

2007 singles
J-pop songs
Victor Entertainment singles
2007 songs